Jonathan Godfread is an American politician from the state of North Dakota. A member of the Republican Party, he is the North Dakota Insurance Commissioner, and has served in the role since 2016.

Early life and career
Godfread is from Grand Forks, North Dakota. He attended Red River High School, and played for the school's basketball team. He graduated in 2000. He committed to attend the University of Utah to play college basketball for the Utah Utes men's basketball team. After taking a redshirt for Utah in his freshman year, he decided to transfer to the University of Northern Iowa. He played college basketball for the Northern Iowa Panthers, who qualified for the NCAA Division I men's basketball tournament in 2004 and 2005. Godfread graduated from Northern Iowa in 2005. After his college basketball career, Godfread played professionally in Germany for the Ehingen Urspring of ProA for one season.

Godfread returned to the United States and enrolled at the University of North Dakota, where he graduated with a Master of Business Administration and Juris Doctor in 2011. He worked for Alerus Financial and served as vice president for the Greater North Dakota Chamber.

Political career
After the incumbent North Dakota Insurance Commissioner, Adam Hamm, announced he would not seek reelection in 2016, Godfread announced his candidacy to succeed him. Godfread was elected state insurance commissioner, defeating Democrat Ruth Buffalo. As Insurance Commissioner, Godfread supported Wayne Stenehjem's decision to join California v. Texas, opposing the constitutionality of the Affordable Care Act. Godfread was reelected in 2020 unopposed.

Personal life
Godfread and Amanda (née Hvidsten) became engaged in 2011. They married and have three children.

After Guinness World Records certified Robert Cornegy as the World's Tallest Politician in January 2019, Godfread challenged the record.

References

American expatriate basketball people in Germany
Basketball players from North Dakota
Ehingen Urspring players
Insurance Commissioners of North Dakota
Living people
North Dakota Republicans
Northern Iowa Panthers men's basketball players
Politicians from Grand Forks, North Dakota
Sportspeople from Grand Forks, North Dakota
University of North Dakota alumni
Year of birth missing (living people)